This is a List of honorary citizens of Skopje North Macedonia. *

References 

Skopje
 Honorary citizens
Skopje